Alleizettella is a genus of flowering plants in the family Rubiaceae. It is restricted to southeastern China and northern Vietnam. The genus commemorates French botanist Aymar Charles d'Alleizette.

Species 
 Alleizettella leucocarpa (Champ. ex Benth.) Tirveng. - China and Vietnam
 Alleizettella rubra Pit. - Vietnam

References

External links 
Alleizettella in the World Checklist of Rubiaceae

Rubiaceae genera
Gardenieae
Taxonomy articles created by Polbot